McIngvale is a surname. Notable people with the surname include:

Elizabeth McIngvale (born 1986), American activist
Jim McIngvale (born 1951), American businessman